Caroline Street is a pedestrianised street running east/west in the lower part of Cardiff city centre, located between The Hayes and St. Mary's Street. It is known locally as Chippy Lane due to the density of fast food shops along the street.

History
Located within the original town walls of Cardiff, and just south of the original Cardiff Gaol, much as though its modern form caters for the eating needs of the public, a number of buildings in Caroline Street have listed building status. Caroline Street was renamed in the Victorian era after Caroline of Brunswick, the wife of King George IV. The next street south is Charlotte Street, named after their daughter Princess Charlotte of Wales. In 1857, the same year that the last public execution took place in Cardiff, records show that 150 died as a result of an outbreak of smallpox on Caroline Street.

Chippy Lane

Up until the post-World War II period, the street was a traditional mixed-trading street, with occupants including butchers and cobblers.

Since that time, the number of family and privately owned fast food outlets has steadily increased, and as of 2011 only a single outlet for Greggs bakery is resident on the Hayes end of the street, keeping Caroline Street relatively free of national and international chains and franchises. Dorothy's claims to be the oldest resident fast food shop on Caroline Street, which is a fish and chip shop. The favourite fare served by all shops includes the preferred South Wales delicacy of curry sauce and chips. Colloquially locals call the street Chippy Alley.

Reputation

Such is the reputation of Caroline Street amongst local residents and numerous university students, that it is normally a riotous but well behaved location, with premises staying open until past 2:00 am on Friday and Saturday nights. In 2010 the licensing officer for South Wales Police described Caroline Street as "a honey pot for anti-social behaviour. There are a lot of late night incidents in the area... During the peak period between 11pm-4am this area is a hotspot for crime."

Prominent incidents occasionally occur, such as in January 2011 when the then Cardiff City F.C. footballer Craig Bellamy was arrested and bailed on an alleged assault claim, in which two men suffered facial injuries.

The street's reputation is referenced in an episode of the sitcom Gavin & Stacey.

2003 refurbishment
  
In 2003, after the development of the mixed-use Old Brewery Quarter from Brains Brewery former premises, and the proposed redevelopment of both the St David's Centre and The Hayes, it was decided to refurbish Caroline Street. Pedestrianised, the street floor structure was given a stone based easy-clean finish, although late at night this has still not resolved the problem of pedestrians slipping even when sober, due to the sheer volume of food packaging and food waste which the street accumulates. It has however made it far easier to clean and keep clean.

References

External links

Review of Caroline Street at yelp.co.uk

Welsh cuisine
Culture in Cardiff
Cardiff
Castle, Cardiff